This is a list of investigational hallucinogens and entactogens, or hallucinogens and entactogens that are currently under formal development for clinical use but are not yet approved. Many of the indications are not for continuous medication therapy but rather for medication-assisted psychotherapy or short-term use only. Chemical/generic names are listed first, with developmental code names, synonyms, and brand names in parentheses.

Hallucinogens

Psychedelics
 Dimethyltryptamine (DMT) – addiction, substance-related disorders – Entheon Biomedical 
 Lysergic acid diethylamide (LSD; "Lucy") – anxiety disorders, attention-deficit hyperactivity disorder – MAPS, MindMed   
 Psilocybin (COMP-360, PB-1818, PSY-0.1–0.6, MYCO-001) – bipolar depression, depressive disorders, major depressive disorder, somatoform disorders – COMPASS Pathways, PsyBio Therapeutics, Mydecine

Dissociatives
 Arketamine ((R)-ketamine; HR-071603) – depressive disorders – Jiangsu Hengrui Medicine 
 Esketamine ((S)-ketamine; PG061) – bipolar depression, depressive disorders – Celon Pharma 
 Ketamine (ELE-Ket+, R-107, SHX-001, PMI-100, PMI-150, SLS-002, TUR-002; Ereska) – major depressive disorder, suicidal ideation, cluster headaches – Eleusis, Douglas Pharmaceuticals, Shenox Pharmaceuticals, CCH Pharmaceuticals, Seelos Therapeutics

Others/mixed
 18-Methoxycoronaridine (18-MC) – leishmaniasis, opioid-related disorders, substance-related disorders – MindMed 
 Ibogaine – opioid-related disorders – ATAI Life Sciences/DemeRx

Entactogens
 Midomafetamine (MDMA; "Ecstasy") – post-traumatic stress disorders, mood disorders, substance-related disorders, social anxiety in autism – MAPS, MindMed   
 MYCO-002 – MDMA-like entactogen – Mydecine

Others/unsorted
 Ketanserin – LSD neutralization – MindMed

Mixed
 Lysergic acid diethylamide/midomafetamine (LSD/MDMA) – psychedelic-assisted psychotherapy – MindMed

See also
 List of investigational drugs

References

External links
 AdisInsight - Springer

Drug-related lists
Experimental drugs